A Salute to American Music is a 113-minute live album of music, both classical and popular, performed by Steven Blier, Renée Fleming, Paul Groves, Jerry Hadley, Karen Holvik, Marilyn Horne, Jeff Mattsey, Robert Merrill, Sherrill Milnes, Maureen O'Flynn, Phyllis Pancella, Leontyne Price, Samuel Ramey, Daniel Smith, Frederica von Stade, Tatiana Troyanos, Carol Vaness and Denise Woods with the Collegiate Chorale and members of the Metropolitan Opera Orchestra under the direction of James Conlon. The album was released in 1992.

Background
The album was recorded at the sixteenth annual gala of the Richard Tucker Music Foundation, a charity which supports American opera singers in their training and in beginning their careers. (The Foundation was set up in memory of Richard Tucker (1913-1975), an American operatic tenor, by his widow, children, friends and colleagues.) The gala was televised in the United States by PBS.

Recording
The album was digitally recorded at a live performance on 10 November 1991 in the Avery Fisher Hall, New York City.

Packaging
The cover of the album, designed under the art direction of J. J. Stelmach, features Flag (1954-1955) by Jasper Johns, a  encaustic painting made of oil and collage on fabric mounted on plywood. The painting is in the Museum of Modern Art, New York City, to which it was given by Philip Johnson in honour of Alfred H. Barr, Jr.

Critical reception

Peter Dickinson reviewed a disc of excerpts from the album in Gramophone in June 1993. The Richard Tucker Music Foundation's sixteenth gala was, he wrote, in the words of its conductor, "a look at an era just gone by". It was launched by one of its most senior contributors, Leontyne Price, with a Broadway-style arrangement of "America the Beautiful". (Oddly, the CD's insert booklet denied the hymnodist Samuel Augustus Ward his due credit as the song's composer.) Even "at the age of 63, she [could] still summon enough patriotic fervour to make non-Americans want to apply for citizenship papers on the spot".

Kurt Weill made the first of his two appearances on the record in the "ecstatic virtuosity" of the Ice Cream Sextet from Street Scene, a work which had lately become more salient after a staging at the English National Opera and the release of cast albums by Decca and TER. The composer was not quite as well served by the 74-year-old Robert Merrill, who sang "touchingly" in "September Song" from Knickerbocker Glory but who was infuriatingly out of synchrony with James Conlon's orchestra.

A single poem by William Blake, curiously, featured in the gala twice. His famous Tiger burned bright both in a song from Virgil Thomson's 1951 Five Songs from William Blake - one of two settings of Blake's text that Thomson had composed - and in William Bolcom's "The Tyger". It was Bolcom's version that was greeted more warmly, "bringing the house down" with an array of percussion instruments revelling behind chanting choristers.

Profounder depths of feeling were plumbed by Samuel Barber and Stephen Foster. The "polished nostalgia" of "Must the winter come so soon?" from Barber's Vanessa might be somewhat "calculating", but it was sung "hauntingly" by Frederica von Stade. Carol Vaness sang "Give me my robe" from Barber's Antony and Cleopatra with "equal poignancy". And Stephen Foster's "Ah, may the red rose live always" received one of the concert's most affecting performances from Karen Holvik, accompanied simply by Steven Blier's piano.

Leonard Bernstein was the one composer given the accolade of being heard in three different compositions. The ensemble "Make our garden grow" represented Candide, one of his Chichester Psalms was sung by an "on form" Collegiate Chorale and Jerry Hadley sang "Maria" from West Side Story in a voice that went "a bit over the top intonationally" at the peak of its erotic rhapsodizing. And two of America's other great mezzo-sopranos followed in the wake of von Stade. Tatiana Troyanos performed Robert Lowry's "At the River", in its arrangement by Aaron Copland, with "impressive, quiet dignity". And "finally, in case you didn't sign on for US citizenship, Marilyn Horne [gave] a truly commanding performance" of Irving Berlin's ageless "God Bless America". All in all, Dickinson concluded, it was not enough merely to say that the gala, recorded before "an enthusiastic audience", was a success. "It's a wow!"

The album was also reviewed in Classic CD and in Fanfare.

Track listing, CD1
 1 (0:18) Introduction
Samuel A. Ward (1848-1903)
 2 (3:23) "America the Beautiful" (music: 1883, lyrics by Katherine Lee Bates: 1895); Leontyne Price
 3 (0:50) Gala introduction
 4 (1:15) Introduction
Gian Carlo Menotti (1911-2007)
 5 (4:25) Amelia Goes to the Ball (1936, libretto by Menotti): Overture
 6 (1:04) Introduction
Kurt Weill (1900-1950)
 7 (4:48) Street Scene (1946, lyrics by Langston Hughes, book by Elmer Rice): "Ice Cream Sextet"; Maureen O'Flynn, Phyllis Pancella, Jerry Hadley, Paul Groves, Daniel Smith and Jeff Mattsey
 8 (1:01) Introduction
Virgil Thomson (1896-1989)
 9 (2:33) Five Songs from William Blake (1951): "Tiger, tiger"; Sherrill Milnes
Charles T. Griffes (1884-1920)
10 (3:41) Three Poems of Fiona MacLeod (1918): "The Lament of Ian the Proud"; Renée Fleming
11 (0:29) Introduction
Stephen Foster (1826-1864)
12 (4:42) "Ah, may the red rose live always"; Karen Holvik
Leonard Bernstein (1918-1990)
13 (3:24) Chichester Psalms (1965): Part One; Chorus
14 (1:23) Introduction
Aaron Copland (1900-1990)
15 (3:03) "At the River"; Tatiana Troyanos
16 (0:33) Introduction
William Bolcom (b. 1938)
17 (2:02) Songs of Innocence and of Experience (1984, text by William Blake): "The Tyger"; Chorus
18 (0:25) Introduction
Douglas Moore (1893-1969)
19 (3:06) The Devil and Daniel Webster (1938): "I've got a ram, Goliath"; Sherrill Milnes
20 (0:29) Introduction
Marc Blitzstein (1905-1964)
21 (8:17) Regina (1948, libretto by Blitzstein): "Rain Quartet"; Maureen O'Flynn, Renée Fleming, Denise Woods, Samuel Ramey, Jeff Mattsey and Chorus
22 (1:32) Introduction
George Gershwin (1898-1937)
23 (4:38) Porgy and Bess (1935, libretto by DuBose Heyward and Ira Gershwin): "Leavin' for the promised land"; Denise Woods, Chorus

Track listing, CD2
Igor Stravinsky (1892-1971)
 1 (0:40) The Rake's Progress (1951): Fanfare
 2 (1:25) Introduction
Marvin David Levy (1932-2015)
 3 (5:13) Mourning Becomes Electra (1967, libretto by Henry W. Butler): "Too weak to kill the man I hate"; Sherrill Milnes
 4 (0:45) Introduction
Samuel Barber (1910-1981)
 5 (3:04) Vanessa (1958, libretto by Gian Carlo Menotti): "Must the winter come so soon?"; Frederica von Stade
 6 (0:35) Introduction
Carlisle Floyd (b. 1926)
 7 (3:51) Susannah (1955, libretto by Floyd): "Hear me, O Lord (prayer of repentance)"; Samuel Ramey
 8 (1:09) Introduction
Samuel Barber
 9 (9:21) Antony and Cleopatra: "Give me my robe"; Carol Vaness
10 (0:31) Introduction
Cole Porter (1891-1964)
11 (4:02) Gay Divorce (1932): "Night and Day"; Samuel Ramey
12 (0:25) Introduction
Duke Ellington (1899-1974)
13 (3:34) "Prelude to a Kiss"; Renée Fleming
14 (0:36) Introduction
Kurt Weill
15 (2:27) Knickerbocker Holiday: "September Song"; Robert Merrill
16 (0:41) Introduction
Leonard Bernstein
17 (3:22) West Side Story: "Maria"; Jerry Hadley
18 (0:26) Introduction
Richard Rodgers (1902-1979)
19 (4:49) Carousel (1945, lyrics by Oscar Hammerstein II): "If I loved you"; Carol Vaness and Jeff Mattsey
20 (0:24) Introduction
Irving Berlin (1888-1989)
21 (2:26) "God Bless America" (1938, lyrics by Berlin); Marilyn Horne
22 (0:53) Introduction
Leonard Bernstein
23 (5:06) Candide (1956): "Make our garden grow": Renée Fleming, Jerry Hadley, Chorus and Company

Personnel

Musicians
 Renée Fleming, soprano
 Paul Groves, tenor
 Jerry Hadley (1952-2007), tenor
 Karen Holvik, soprano
 Marilyn Horne, mezzo-soprano
 Jeff Mattsey, baritone
 Robert Merrill (1917-2004), baritone
 Sherrill Milnes, baritone
 Maureen O'Flynn, soprano
 Phyllis Pancella, mezzo-soprano
 Leontyne Price, soprano
 Samuel Ramey, bass
 Daniel Smith, tenor
 Frederica von Stade, mezzo-soprano
 Tatiana Troyanos (1938-1993), mezzo-soprano
 Carol Vaness, soprano
 Denise Woods, soprano
 Collegiate Chorale (renamed MasterVoices in 2015)
 Members of the Metropolitan Opera Orchestra
 Robert Bass, chorus master
 Steven Blier, piano and musical consultant
 James Conlon, conductor and artistic director

Other
 John Pfeiffer (1920-1996), producer
 Matthew A. Epstein, artistic consultant
 Dave Hewitt, recording engineer
 Phil Gitomer, recording engineer
 Anthony Salvatore, editing and digital mastering
 D'Alessio Productions, technical co-ordination
 Barry Tucker, President of the Richard Tucker Foundation
 Karen Kriendler Nelson, Executive Director of the Richard Tucker Foundation

Release history
In 1992, RCA Victor Red Seal issued the album on CD (catalogue number 09026-61508-2) with a 12-page insert booklet presenting an account of the Richard Tucker Music Foundation, notes on the concert by James Conlon and photographs of Tucker, Conlon, Hadley. Horne. Merrill, Milnes, Price, Ramey, von Stade and Vaness. The booklet did not offer texts or translations. Also in 1992, RCA Victor Red Seal issued an abridged, 72-minute version of the album (catalogue number 09026-61509-2) that omitted the 2-CD version's introductions and six of its selections - the items by Douglas Moore, Marc Blitzstein, Igor Stravinsky, Cole Porter, Duke Ellington and Richard Rodgers. The excerpts disc was accompanied by an 8-page booklet that provided the same notes and photographs as the other insert with the exception of its photograph of Conlon.

References

1992 classical albums
1992 live albums
Live classical albums